Maries may refer to:
 Maries, Thasos, village in Greece
 Maries, Zakynthos, village in Greece
 Maries County, Missouri
 Maries River, Missouri
 Charles Maries (1851–1902), English botanist 
 Maries fir, native to mountains of Japan, named after Charles Maries

See also
 St. Maries, Idaho